Phoneutria eickstedtae is a species of spider in the family Ctenidae, found in Brazil.

References

Ctenidae
Spiders of Brazil
Spiders described in 2007